The Chapel of St. Lucy is a former Roman Catholic parish church under the authority of the Roman Catholic Archdiocese of New York, located in Cochecton, Sullivan County, New York. The parish was established in 1884 as a mission of Holy Cross in Callicoon; the parish closed after 1965.

References 

Religious organizations established in 1884
1965 disestablishments in New York (state)
Closed churches in the Roman Catholic Archdiocese of New York
Closed churches in New York (state)
Roman Catholic churches in New York (state)
Churches in Sullivan County, New York
1884 establishments in New York (state)